AB Tajul Islam (born 5 May 1951) is a Bangladesh Awami League politician who served as the state minister of Liberation War Affairs. He is a retired Bangladesh Army Captain.

Early life 
Islam graduated in economics from the University of Dhaka. He later joined the Bangladesh Army.

Career 
Islam was elected to parliament in 1996, 2008, and 2014 from Brahmanbaria-6 as a candidate of Bangladesh Awami League. He served as the state minister for liberation war affairs. He is the chairman of the Parliamentary Standing Committee on the Liberation War Ministry.

Controversy 
According to a probe by the Anti-Corruption Commission, Islam abused his powers as State Minister by providing Freedom Fighter Certificates to five government employees without following proper protocol. According to the commission, three government officials managed to become leaders of the Muktijoddha Sangsad illegally through their political and family connections to Islam.

Personal life 
Islam is married to Hasu Islam.

References

Living people
1951 births
University of Dhaka alumni
Mukti Bahini personnel
Awami League politicians
Bangladesh Army officers
State Ministers of Liberation War Affairs
11th Jatiya Sangsad members